Kucha, or Kuche (also: Kuçar, Kuchar; , Кучар; ,), was an ancient Buddhist kingdom located on the branch of the Silk Road that ran along the northern edge of what is now the Taklamakan Desert in the Tarim Basin and south of the Muzat River.

The former area of Kucha now lies in present-day Aksu Prefecture, Xinjiang, China. Kuqa town is the county seat of Aksu Prefecture's Kuqa County. Its population was given as 74,632 in 1990.

Etymology 
The history of toponyms for modern Kucha remain somewhat problematic; however, it is clear that Kucha, Kuchar (in Turkic languages) and Kuché (modern Chinese), correspond to the Kushan of Indic scripts from late antiquity.

While Chinese transcriptions of the Han or the Tang imply that Küchï was the original form of the name, Guzan (or Küsan), is attested in the Old Tibetan Annals (s.v.), dating from 687 CE. Uighur and Chinese transcriptions from the period of the Mongol Empire support the forms Küsän / Güsän and Kuxian / Quxian respectively, instead of Küshän or Kushan. Another, cognate Chinese transliteration is Ku-sien.

Transcriptions of the name Kushan in Indic scripts from late antiquity include the spelling Guṣân, and are apparently reflected in at least one Khotanese-Tibetan transcription.

The forms Kūsān and Kūs are attested in the 16th century work Tarikh-i-Rashidi. Both names, as well as Kos, Kucha, Kujar etc., were used for modern Kucha.

Chinese names of Kucha – 曲先; 屈支 屈茨; 丘慈 丘玆 邱慈; 俱支曩; 歸兹; 拘夷; 苦叉 and; 姑藏 – have been romanized as Quxian, Quici, Chiu-tzu, Kiu-che, Kuei-tzu, Guizi, Juyi, Kucha, and Guzang.  Although 龜玆 has sometimes been romanized as Qiuzi (or Wade-Giles: Ch'iu-tzu), this is generally regarded as incorrect; the second syllable is more properly represented as ci (Wade-Giles: tz'u).

History

Kingdom
For a long time, Kucha was the most populous oasis in the Tarim Basin. As a Central Asian metropolis, it was part of the Silk Road economy, and was in contact with the rest of Central Asia, including Sogdiana and Bactria, and thus also with the cultures of South Asia, Iran, and the coastal areas of China. The main population of Kucha was Indo-European, part of the ancient population of the Tarim Basin known as Tocharians, and Kuchans spoke an Indo-European language known as Tocharian. Chinese sources from the 2nd century BCE did mention Indo-European Wusun populations with blue eyes and red hair in the area of the Ili river, to the northwest of Kucha.  Chinese official and diplomat Zhang Qian traveled the area westward to visit Central Asia, during the 2nd century BCE, stopping at Kucha. Chinese chronicles recount that Princess Xijun, a Han princess married to the king of the Wusun, had a daughter who was sent to the Han court in 64 BC, but when the daughter stopped at Kucha on the way, she decided to marry the king of the Kucha kingdom instead. The Roman Maes Titianus visited the area of Kucha in the 2nd century CE. According to the Book of Han (completed in 111 CE), Kucha was the largest of the "Thirty-six Kingdoms of the Western Regions", with a population of 81,317, including 21,076 persons able to bear arms. The Kingdom of Kucha occupied a strategic position on the Northern Silk Road, which brought prosperity, and made Kucha a wealthy center of trade and culture.

Han-Xiongnu contention

During the Later Han (25–220 CE), Kucha, with the whole Tarim Basin, became a focus of rivalry between the Xiong-nu to the north and the Chinese to the east. In 74 CE, Chinese troops started to take control of the Tarim Basin with the conquest of Turfan. During the 1st century CE, Kucha resisted the Chinese invasion, and allied itself with the Xiong-nu and the Yuezhi against the Chinese general Ban Chao. Even the Kushan Empire of Kujula Kadphises sent an army to the Tarim Basin to support Kucha, but they retreated after minor encounters.

Chinese conquest
In 124, Kucha formally submitted to the Chinese court, and by 127 China had conquered the whole of the Tarim Basin. Kucha became a part of the Western protectorate of the Chinese Han Dynasty, with China's control of the Silk Road facilitating the exchange of art and the propagation of Buddhism from Central Asia. The Roman Maes Titianus visited the area in the 2nd century CE, as did numerous great Buddhist missionaries such as the Parthian An Shigao, the Yuezhis Lokaksema and Zhi Qian, or the Indian Chu Sho-fu (竺朔佛). Around 150 CE, Chinese power in the western territories receded, and the Tarim Basin and its city-states regained independence.

4th and 5th century Silk Road

Kucha became very powerful and rich in the last quarter of the 4th century CE, about to take over most of the trade along the Silk Road at the expense of the Southern Silk Road, which lay along the southern edge of the Tarim Basin. According to the Jinshu, Kucha was highly fortified, had a splendid royal palace, as well as many Buddhist stupas and temples:

Culture flourished, and Indian Sanskrit scriptures were being translated by the Kuchean monk and translator Kumarajiva (344-413 CE), himself the son of a man from Kashmir and a Kuchean mother. The southern kingdoms of Shan-shan and Jushi (Turfan and Jiaohe) asked for Chinese assistance in countering Kucha and its neighbour Karashar. The Chinese general Lü Guang was sent with a military force by Emperor Fu Jian (357-385) of the Former Qin Dynasty (351-394). Lu-Guang obtained the surrender of Karashar and conquered Kucha in 383 CE. Lu-Guang mentioned the powerful armour of Kucha soldiers, a type of Sasanian chainmail and lamellar armour which can also be seen in the paintings of the Kizil Caves:

Lu-Guang soon retired and the empire of Fu Jian crumbled against the Eastern Jin, and he established his own principality in Gansu, bringing Kumarajiva together with him.

6th century
 
 
Kucha ambassadors are known to have visited the Chinese court of Emperor Yuan of Liang in his capital Jingzhou in 516–520 CE, at or around the same time as the Hepthalite embassies there. An ambassador from Kucha is illustrated in Portraits of Periodical Offering of Liang, painted in 526-539 CE, an 11th century Song copy of which has survived.

The Chinese pilgrim Xuanzang visited Kucha and in the 630s described Kucha at some length, and the following are excerpts from his descriptions of Kucha:
 

A specific style of music developed within the region and "Kuchean" music gained popularity as it spread along the trade lines of the Silk Road. Lively scenes of Kuchean music and dancing can be found in the Kizil Caves and are described in the writings of Xuanzang. "[T]he fair ladies and benefactresses of Kizil and Kumtura in their tight-waisted bodices and voluminous skirts recall--notwithstanding the Buddhic theme--that at all the halting places along the Silk Road, in all the rich caravan towns of the Tarim, Kucha was renowned as a city of pleasures, and that as far as China men talked of its musicians, its dancing girls, and its courtesans." Kuchean music was very popular in Tang China, particularly the lute, which became known in Chinese as the pipa. For example, within the collection of the Guimet Museum, two Tang female musician figures represent the two prevailing traditions: one plays a Kuchean pipa and the other plays a Chinese jiegu (an Indian-style drum). The music of Kucha, along with other early medieval music,  was transmitted from China to Japan during the same period and is preserved there, somewhat transformed, as gagaku or Japanese court music.

Conquest by Tang
Following its conquest by the Tang dynasty in the 7th century, during Emperor Taizong's campaign against the Western Regions, the city of Kucha was regarded by Han Chinese as one of the Four Garrisons of Anxi: the "Pacified West", or even its capital. During periods of Tibetan domination it was usually at least semi-independent. It fell under Uyghur domination and became an important center of the later Uyghur Kingdom of Qocho after the Kyrgyz destruction of the Uyghur steppe empire in 840.

Modern Kucha

Francis Younghusband, who passed through the oasis in 1887 on his journey from Beijing to India, described the district as "probably" having some 60,000 inhabitants. It was filled with houses and "a few bad shops". The "Turk houses" ran right up to the edge of the ditch and there were remains of an old city to the south-east of the Chinese one, but most of the shops and houses were outside of it.

Modern Kucha is part of Kuqa County, Xinjiang. It is divided into the new city, which includes the People's Square and transportation center, and the old city, where the Friday market and vestiges of the past city wall and cemetery are located. Along with agriculture, the city also manufactures cement, carpets and other household necessities in its local factories.

Archaeological investigations
There are several significant archaeological sites in the region which were investigated by the third (1905–1907, led by Albert Grünwedel) and fourth (1913–1914, led by Albert von Le Coq) German Turfan expeditions. Those in the immediate vicinity include the cave site of Achik-Ilek and Subashi.

Kucha and Buddhism

Kucha was an important Buddhist center from Antiquity until the late Middle Ages. Buddhism was introduced to Kucha before the end of the 1st century, however it was not until the 4th century that the kingdom became a major center of Buddhism, primarily the Sarvastivada, but eventually also Mahayana Buddhism during the Uighur period. In this respect it differed from Khotan, a Mahayana-dominated kingdom on the southern side of the desert.

According to the Book of Jin, during the third century there were nearly one thousand Buddhist stupas and temples in Kucha. At this time, Kuchanese monks began to travel to China. The fourth century saw yet further growth for Buddhism within the kingdom. The palace was said to resemble a Buddhist monastery, displaying carved stone Buddhas, and monasteries around the city were numerous.

Kucha is well known as the home of the great fifth-century translator monk Kumārajīva (344-413).

Monks

Po-Yen
A monk from the royal family known as Po-Yen travelled to the Chinese capital, Luoyang, from 256-260. He translated six Buddhist texts into Chinese in 258 at China's famous White Horse Temple, including the Infinite Life Sutra, an important sutra in Pure Land Buddhism.

Po-Śrīmitra
Po-Śrīmitra was another Kuchean monk who traveled to China from 307-312 and translated three Buddhist texts.

Po-Yen
A second Kuchean Buddhist monk known as Po-Yen also went to Liangzhou (modern Wuwei, Gansu, China) and is said to have been well respected, although he is not known to have translated any texts.

Tocharian languages

The language of Kucha, as evidenced by surviving manuscripts and inscriptions, was Kuśiññe (Kushine) also known as Tocharian B or West Tocharian, an Indo-European language. Later, under the Uighur domination, the Kingdom of Kucha gradually became Turkic speaking. Kuśiññe was completely forgotten until the early 20th century, when inscriptions and documents in two related (but mutually unintelligible) languages were discovered at various sites in the Tarim Basin. Conversely, Tocharian A, or Ārśi was native to the region of Turpan (known later as Turfan) and Agni (Qarašähär; Karashar), although the Kuśiññe language also seems to have been spoken there.

While written in a Central Asian Brahmi script used typically for Indo-Iranian languages, the Tocharian languages (as they became known by modern scholars) belong to the centum group of Indo-European languages, which are otherwise native to southern and western Europe. The precise dating of known Tocharian texts is contested, but they were written around the 6th to 8th centuries CE (although Tocharian speakers must have arrived in the region much earlier). Both languages became extinct before circa 1000 CE. Scholars are still trying to piece together a fuller picture of these languages, their origins, history and connections, etc.

Neighbors
The kingdom bordered Aksu and Kashgar to the west and Karasahr and Turpan to the east.  Across the Taklamakan Desert to the south was Khotan.

Kucha and the Kizil Caves

The caves claim origins from the royal family of ancient Kucha, specifically a local legend involving Princess Zaoerhan, the daughter of the King of Kucha. While out hunting, the princess met and fell in love with a local mason. When the mason approached the king to ask for permission to marry the princess, the king was appalled and vehemently against the union. He told the young man he would not grant permission unless the mason carved 1000 caves into the local hills. Determined, the mason went to the hills and began carving in order to prove himself to the king. After three years and carving 999 caves, he died from the exhaustion of the work. The distraught princess found his body, and grieved herself to death, and now, her tears are said to be current waterfalls that cascade down some of the cave's rock faces.

Coinage 

From around the third or fourth century Kucha began the manufacture of Wu Zhu (五銖) cash coins inspired by the diminutive and devalued Wu Zhu's of the post-Han dynasty era in Chinese history. It is very likely that the cash coins produced in Kucha predate the Kaiyuan Tongbao (開元通寳) and that the native production of coins stopped sometime after the year 621 when the Wu Zhu cash coins were discontinued in China proper. The coinage of Kucha includes the "Han Qiu bilingual Wu Zhu coin" (漢龜二體五銖錢, hàn qiū èr tǐ wǔ zhū qián) which has a yet undeciphered text belonging to a language spoken in Kucha.

Timeline
630: Xuanzang visited the kingdom.

Rulers
(Names are in modern Mandarin pronunciations based on ancient Chinese records) 
Hong (弘) 16
Cheng De (丞德) 36
Ze Luo (則羅) 46
Shen Du (身毒) 50
Jiang Bin (絳賓) 72
Jian (建) 73
You Liduo (尤利多) 76
Bai Ba (白霸) 91
Bai Ying (白英) 110-127

Bai Shan (白山) 280
Long Hui (龍會) 326
Bai Chun (白純) 349
Bai Zhen (白震) 382
Niruimo Zhunashen (尼瑞摩珠那勝) 521
Bai Sunidie (白蘇尼咥) 562
Anandavarman ? 
Tottika (circa 550-600) 
Suvarnapushpa (白蘇伐勃駃 Bái Sūfábókuài) 600-625
Suvarnadeva (白蘇伐疊 Bai Sufadie) 625-645
Haripuspa (白訶黎布失畢, Bai Helibushibi) 647
Bai Yehu (白葉護) 648
Bai Helibushibi (白訶黎布失畢) 650
Bai Suji (白素稽) 659
Yan Tiandie (延田跌) 678
Bai Mobi (白莫苾) 708
Bai Xiaojie (白孝節) 719
Bai Huan (白環) 731-789? / Tang general - Guo Xin 789

See also 
 Ci poetry
 Kushan Empire
 Silk Road numismatics
 Silk Road transmission of Buddhism
 Subashi (lost city)

References

Bibliography

 
 
  Google Books

Primary sources
The Book of Han
The Book of the Later Han
The Book of Jin

External links

 Silk Road Seattle - University of Washington (The Silk Road Seattle website contains many useful resources including a number of full-text historical works)
 Kucha at Google Maps

Ancient peoples of China
Former countries in Chinese history
Central Asian Buddhist kingdoms
Central Asian Buddhist sites
Populated places along the Silk Road
Populated places in Xinjiang
Oases of China